Jan van den Berg may refer to:

 Jan van den Bergh (painter) (1587–1660), Dutch painter
 Jan van den Berg (footballer) (1879–1951), Dutch footballer
 Jan Van den Bergh (born 1994), Belgian footballer